Oru Abhibhashakante Case Diary is a 1995 Indian Malayalam-language mystery legal drama film directed by K. Madhu and written by S. N. Swamy.The film stars Mammootty, Heera Rajagopal, Jagathy Sreekumar, Vijayaraghavan, Rajan P. Dev and Narendra Prasad. The plot is about a lawyer, seeking justice for a teenage girl who was raped and murdered. The film has soundtrack composed by Raveendran while the background music is scored by Rajamani.

Plot 

A young servant girl is raped, murdered and her body is dumped in a pond. The police accuse Unni Thampuran of murder and arrest him. Following torture methods, a confession is extracted from Unni Thamburan and the case is ready to be presented at the court.

Aniyan Kuruvilla, the public prosecutor, discovers flaws in the investigation and declines to fight. Convinced about Unni Thampuran's innocence, he switches sides and decides to fight for him. The prosecution hires a bent and a crooked lawyer Jagatheesh T. Nambiar and through a barrage of false witnesses and doctored testimonies, Unni Thampuran is found guilty and sentenced to life imprisonment.

Aniyan Kuruvilla, though beaten, doesn't lose hope and starts a private investigation of his own and discovers that a group of spoilt boys, Reji and his friends are responsible for the brutal murder. Incidentally, they also meet another woman who was raped by the trio. Reji is the son of a very powerful and influential woman, Accama.

Aniyan Kuruvilla reopens the case in court. Nambiar asks the court to dismiss the reopening as such move is very rare. He produces proof that the accused were in Palakkad attending a wedding and couldn't reach the spot of rape on the time as mentioned in the case file. Aniyan Kuruvila successfully proves the alibi as forged and thus helps to serve justice.

Cast

Soundtrack

The soundtrack was composed by Raveendran Master whilst the original background music is scored by Rajamani.It features two tracks which were sung by Dr. K. J. Yesudas and Sujatha Mohan.Both of the songs were penned by Shibu Chakravarthy.

Reception 
The song "Kanikkonnakal" received mostly positive reviews and became one of the popular hits in the 90s.

References

External links 
 
 http://popcorn.oneindia.in/title/7237/oru-abhibhashakante-case-diary.html

1990s Malayalam-language films
1990s crime drama films
1995 films
Films directed by K. Madhu
Films scored by Raveendran
1995 drama films